WYYS 106.1 FM is a radio station broadcasting a classic hits format. Licensed to Streator, Illinois, the station covers LaSalle, Ottawa, and vicinity and is owned by Studstill Media.

History
WYYS began as a simulcast of co owned WSTQ 97.7 in 1995, airing a country music format. The station was owned by Kleven-Rodriguez Partners. In 2000, the station was bought by Mendota Broadcasting. In January 2000, WYYS began simulcasting the talk radio format of sister station WIZZ AM 1250. In 2002, the station adopted a soft AC format. On December 26, 2004, the station flipped to its current classic hits format.

On January 24, 2023, it was announced that Studstill Media had sold WYYS, along with its sister stations, to Shaw Media in Crystal Lake, Illinois, for a total of $1.8 million. The sale is presently under FCC review with anticipation of being completed later in the year.

References

External links
WYYS's website

YYS
Classic hits radio stations in the United States
Radio stations established in 1995
1995 establishments in Illinois